Nothin' but the Blues is a 1977 album by Johnny Winter.  The album has the following dedication: "I'd like to dedicate this album to all the people who enjoy my kind of blues and especially to Muddy Waters for giving me the inspiration to do it and for giving the world a lifetime of great blues." - Johnny Winter. 

On this album Winter moved away from the rock and blues blend of previous albums to a more blues-oriented album. It also saw a marked change in source of material, being almost exclusively written by Winter, apart from one song by Muddy Waters with whom Winter had recently collaborated and who featured on the album along with his band.

Critical reception
On AllMusic, William Ruhlmann said, "After a long period making rock records, Winter fronts the Muddy Waters band on the aptly titled Nothin' but the Blues.... Winter sounds happier than ever before on this Chicago blues workout."

Parallel Forces wrote, "Released in the wake of [the Muddy Waters album] Hard Again, Nothin' but the Blues has the distinction of being recorded with the same musicians. These two albums mark the return to grace of [Johnny Winter] in the world of blues that he had somewhat neglected in previous years, devoted more to rock."

Track listing
All songs written by Johnny Winter, except "Walkin' thru the Park" by Muddy Waters.
"Tired of Tryin'" - 3:40
"TV Mama" - 3:11
"Sweet Love and Evil Women" - 2:50
"Everybody's Blues" - 5:03
"Drinkin' Blues" - 3:40
"Mad Blues" - 4:17
"It Was Rainin'" - 5:53
"Bladie Mae" - 3:30
"Walkin' thru the Park" - 4:07

Personnel 
Johnny Winter – vocals, electric guitar, metal body acoustic guitar, slide guitar, bass guitar, drums
Muddy Waters – vocals
James Cotton – harmonica
Pinetop Perkins – piano
Bob Margolin – electric guitar
Charles Calmese – electric bass
Willie "Big Eyes" Smith – drums

References

1977 albums
Johnny Winter albums
Albums produced by Johnny Winter
Blue Sky Records albums